Miss Brazil World 2010 was the 21st edition of the Miss Brazil World pageant and 5th under MMB Productions & Events. The contest took place on August 7, 2010. Each state, the Federal District and representatives from various Insular Regions & the Brazilian diaspora competed for the title. Luciana Reis of Roraima crowned Kamilla Salgado of Pará at the end of the contest. Salgado represented Brazil at Miss World 2010. The contest was held at the Hotel do Frade in Angra dos Reis, Rio de Janeiro, Brazil.

Results

Regional Queens of Beauty

Special Awards

Challenge Events

Beauty with a Purpose

Beach Beauty Brazil

Best Model Brazil

Miss Popularity UOL

Miss Sportswoman Brazil

Miss Talent

Delegates
The delegates for Miss Brazil World 2010 were:

States

 - Pâmella Ferrari
 - Morgana Mello
 - Larissa Costa
 - Flávia Silveira
 - Caroline Ferreira
 - Khrisley Gonçalves Karlen
 - Denise Ribeiro
 - Ana Paula Favoretti
 - Pollyana Stemutt
 - Karine Martins
 - Tatiana Strelov
 - Isabella Zaupa
 - Carla Nascimento
 - Kamilla Salgado
 - Laryssa Almeida
 - Jhennifer Martins
 - Palloma Montezuma
 - Paula Cruz
 - Jéssica Barros
 - Jyokonda Rocha
 - Osyane Pilecco
 - Suymara Barreto
 - Sílvia Bitarães
 - Marina Fagundes
 - Karina Pacheli
 - Stefania Crestana
 - Estarlei Öss

Insular Regions & Brazilian Diaspora

 Alcatrazes - Luíza Tessari
 Estados Unidos-Brasil - Carol Lassance
 Fernando de Noronha - Isabelle Nunes
 Ilhabela - Bruna Roman Bois
 Ilha de Porto Belo - Andressa Andreon
 Ilha de Vitória - Jamile Scarpi
 Ilha do Mel - Cristiane Kampa
 Ilhas de Búzios - Andressa Gomes
 - Nawany Miranda
 Trindade e Martim Vaz - Diana Gave

References

External links
 Official site (in Portuguese)

2010
2010 in Brazil
2010 beauty pageants